The women's 500 metres sprint event at the 2017 Summer Universiade was held on 23 August at the Yingfeng Riverside Park Roller Sports Rink (A).

Record

Results

Preliminary Round

Semifinal

Final

References 

Roller sports at the 2017 Summer Universiade